Pabbi is a large town in Pabbi Tehsil of Nowshera District of Khyber-Pakhtunkhwa province of Pakistan. It is located on both sides of the Grand Trunk (GT) around 20-km from Peshawar, the capital of Khyber Pukhtunkhwa province.

Overview 
Pabbi town is the capital and tehsil headquarters of Pabbi tehsil in Nowshera District. It has a train station called Pabbi station and is a market town. Peshawar City is located to the west around 20-km away while Nowshera City is located to the east around 17-km away.

Pabbi is a hub of precast concrete industries located at the main GT road in Chowki Mumraiz. Currently, there are 43 precast concrete industries that are functional in Pabbi which supply different items to the entire Khyber Paktunkhwa and to some parts of the Punjab.

Famous People 
Pabbi is/was a birthplace of several famous people:
Amir Habib  was student Abdul wali khan university mardan serving volunteerly at awkum students council .Member of young leaders parliments.
 Gul Hassan Khan was a former lieutenant-general and the last Commander-in-Chief of the Pakistan Army.
Mian Iftikhat Hussain, Provincial Ex-Minister for information
Sareer Ahmad Khan, ex minister excise and taxation
Sher Zaman Taizi was a Pashtun writer, poet, intellectual, and journalist from Pakistan
Waqar Ahmad Khudrizi, entrepreneur.

Education 
Pabbi is home to many excellent educational institutes. It hosts a campus of the Abdul Wali Khan University Mardan.

It has a campus of the University of Engineering and Technology Peshawar in Jelozai town while it also has a campus of Peshawar University for its botany studies and research at botanical garden Azakhel.

It is also home to 2 degree colleges: Government Degree College Pabbi and Government Girls Degree College Pabbi.

See also 
 Pabbi Tehsil
 Nowshera District

References 

Populated places in Nowshera District